RACE123 is the first international long-run endurance race of South Korea which will be held in Korea International Circuit in 2017. There are five classes : GT3, GTC, Sports Production, Touring Production 1, and Touring Production 2, and the total distance of race is 1,230Km (about 764 miles). The total prize money is US $500,000.

External links 
 RACE123 Regulations

Endurance motor racing
Motorsport in South Korea